Louisa May Alcott School, also known as "School No. 59" and "Reisterstown Road School," is a historic elementary school located at Baltimore, Maryland, United States. It is a Colonial Revival or Georgian Revival structure completed in 1910.  The freestanding building rises 3 ½ to 4 levels from brick base to metal cornice. It features symmetrically designed brick and stucco bands, decorative terra cotta, and three metal cupolas atop the hipped roof.

Louisa May Alcott School was listed on the National Register of Historic Places in 1990.

References

External links
, including photo from 1989, at Maryland Historical Trust

Defunct schools in Maryland
Buildings and structures in Baltimore
School buildings on the National Register of Historic Places in Baltimore
School buildings completed in 1910
Northwest Baltimore
1910 establishments in Maryland